Surveen Chawla (born 1 August 1984) is an Indian actress and dancer who appears in Hindi films and television. She started her career with television shows like Kahin to Hoga and Kajjal. She is known for her roles in movies and shows like Hate Story 2 (2014), Ugly (2013), Parched (2015) and 24 (2016) etc. along with many others films. In 2018, she was seen in the Hindi web series,  Haq Se.

Career

Television debut
Chawla made her television debut as Charu in the Indian serial Kahin To Hoga. She also appeared in the reality dance show Ek Khiladi Ek Haseena in 2008, where she paired up with Indian cricketer S. Sreesanth. Before this, she appeared in the television serial Kasautii Zindagi Kay in 2004. In 2006, she played the lead protagonist in the TV serial Kaajjal, till 2007. She hosted the television show Comedy Circus Ke SuperStars. Then she made her film debut with Kannada film Paramesha Panwala. In 2011, she appeared in the Punjabi film Dharti which was released in April 2011. Thereafter she has appeared in the Punjabi films Taur Mittran Di, Saadi Love Story, Singh vs Kaur, Lucky Di Unlucky Story and Disco Singh (2014). She did her first item number "Dhoka Dhoka" in Sajid Khan's Himmatwala. In 2013, she appeared in Tamil film Moondru Per Moondru Kadhal and also appeared in Puthiya Thiruppangal. She then appeared in Anurag Kashyap's thriller Ugly.

2014–2017 

In October 2014, Chawla appeared in the hit Punjabi song 'Mitran De Boot' along with Jazzy B. In 2014, she also played in Vishal Pandya's erotic revenge thriller Hate Story 2, a sequel to Hate Story (2012) where she portrayed the role of Sonika Prasad, a girl who takes the revenge with those peoples who abused her physically and mentally, as well as who murdered her boyfriend Akshay Bedi (played by Jay Bhanushali), the film was her first women centric film and was successful critically and commercially. Then she appeared in song "Sawan Aaya Hai" opposite Rajneesh Duggal in the film Creature 3D. Her latest Tamil film was Jaihind 2. She appeared in a song "Tuti Bole Wedding Di" in the Hindi film Welcome Back and in a Punjabi film Hero Naam Yaad Rakhi opposite Jimmy Shergill. She also played the role of Bijli in Parched (2015). In 2016, Surveen appeared and participated in Jhalak Dikhhla Jaa but later got voted out in a double elimination along with Arjun Bijlani.

2018–present 
In 2018, Chawla made her debut in digital space with ALT Balaji's web series Haq Se opposite Rajeev Khandelwal. Set in the turbulent terrorist infested Kashmir, the story revolves around the Mirza sisters. Surveen plays Mehr Mirza, the eldest of the four sisters in the series.

Personal life 
Chawla married Akshay Thakker in 2015 in Italy. She revealed about her wedding two years later via Twitter on 27 December 2017.

Filmography

Films

Television

Awards and nominations

References

External links

 
 
 

1984 births
Living people
21st-century Indian actresses
Indian film actresses
Indian television actresses
Actresses in Kannada cinema
Actresses in Punjabi cinema
Actresses in Tamil cinema
Actresses from Chandigarh
Actresses in Hindi television
Punjabi people